The ceremonial county of Cheshire, which comprises the unitary authorities of Cheshire East, Cheshire West and Chester, Halton and Warrington, has returned 11 MPs to the UK Parliament since 1997.

Under the Local Government Act 1972, which came into effect on 1 April 1974, the boundaries of the historic/administrative county of Cheshire were significantly altered. Over half the electorate was transferred to the new metropolitan counties of Greater Manchester and Merseyside, partly compensated by the addition of Warrington, Widnes and surrounding areas to the north which were transferred in from Lancashire. These changes were reflected in the following redistribution of parliamentary seats which did not come into effect until the 1983 general election, resulting in a net reduction in the county's representation from 17 to 10 MPs.

Number of seats 
The table below shows the number of MPs representing Cheshire at each major redistribution of seats affecting the county.

1Prior to 1950, seats were classified as County Divisions or Parliamentary Boroughs. Since 1950, they have been classified as County or Borough Constituencies.

2Borough of Birkenhead (1 member) enfranchised by Act of Parliament to replace disenfranchised boroughs.

3Approximate equivalent number of constituencies. Prior to the redistribution coming into effect for the 1983 general election, 6 constituencies were split between Cheshire and the new counties of Greater Manchester and Merseyside and 7 were wholly within the reconfigured county.

Constituency timeline

Historic county to 1974

Current ceremonial county from 1974

Boundary reviews

Historic county

Prior to 1832 
As a county palatine, Cheshire was unrepresented in the House of Commons until 1545. Under the terms of the Chester and Cheshire (Constituencies) Act 1542, the County of Chester (Cheshire) was thereafter represented by two Knights of the Shire and the City of Chester was represented by 2 burgesses.

1832 
The Great Reform Act of 1832 radically changed the representation of the House of Commons, with the County being divided into the Northern and Southern Divisions, both returning 2 MPs. North Cheshire covered the northern and eastern parts of the county, comprising the Hundreds of Bucklow and Macclesfield; South Cheshire covered the southern and western parts, comprising the Hundreds of Broxton, Eddisbury, Nantwich, Northwich and Wirral. In addition to Chester, the Parliamentary Boroughs of Macclesfield and Stockport were established, both returning 2 MPs.

1865 
Under the terms of the Appropriation of Seats (Sudbury and Saint Alban's) Act 1861, Birkenhead was enfranchised as a single-member Parliamentary Borough. It was first contested at the 1865 general election.

1868 
Under the Reform Act of 1867, the county was further divided, with the creation of Mid Cheshire, comprising the Bucklow and Northwich Hundreds, transferred from North Cheshire and South Cheshire respectively. Stalybridge was established as a single-member Borough.

Subsequently, the Boundary Act 1868 renamed the Northern and Southern Divisions as East Cheshire and West Cheshire respectively.

1885 
Under the Redistribution of Seats Act 1885, the three 2-member county divisions were replaced by eight single-member constituencies, namely Altrincham, Crewe, Eddisbury, Hyde, Knutsford, Macclesfield, Northwich and Wirral. The Parliamentary Borough of Macclesfield was disenfranchised due to corruption. The representation of the City of Chester was reduced to one MP.

1918 
Under the Representation of the People Act 1918, the number of constituencies in Cheshire was increased by one. The major changes were:
 the Parliamentary Borough of Chester was converted into a county division, gaining mainly rural areas from Eddisbury and Wirral;
 the Parliamentary Borough of Stalybridge and the county Division of Hyde were abolished and the new Division of Stalybridge and Hyde created, encompassing Dukinfield, Hyde, Stalybridge and Longdendale. Bredbury, Romily and Marple were transferred to Macclesfield and Hazel Grove to Knutsford;
 Birkenhead was divided into East and West Divisions and Wallasey was created as a Parliamentary Borough, carved out of the Wirral county Division; and
 Stockport continued as a two-member Borough, with boundaries aligned to the County Borough which had expanded through absorbing the Urban Districts of Reddish and Heaton Norris (previously part of the Stretford Division of Lancashire), and into neighbouring parishes in the former Hyde Division.

Other boundary changes included:

 Bramhall transferred from Altrincham to Knutsford;
 Sandbach from Crewe to Northwich; and
 Disley and Whaley Bridge from Knutsford to Macclesfield.

1945 
The House of Commons (Redistribution of Seats) Act 1944 set up Boundary Commissions to carry out periodic reviews of the distribution of parliamentary constituencies. It also authorised an initial review to subdivide abnormally large constituencies (those exceeding an electorate of 100,000) in time for the 1945 election. This was implemented by the Redistribution of Seats Order 1945 under which Cheshire was allocated one additional seat, by splitting the Altrincham Division into two seats:
 Altrincham and Sale Parliamentary Borough, comprising the two respective municipal boroughs; and
 Bucklow County Division, comprising the urban districts of Bowdon, Cheadle and Gatley, Hale and Lymm and surrounding rural areas. It also included the former parishes of Baguley, Northenden and Northen Etchells which had been absorbed into the county borough of Manchester.
Handforth, which had been absorbed into the Urban District of Wilmslow, now included in the Knutsford seat.

1950 
As a result of the redistribution enacted by the Representation of the People Act 1948, Cheshire's representation remained at 15 seats. However, there were significant changes to the make-up of the constituencies as follows:
 In the Wirral, Birkenhead East and Birkenhead West were abolished and Birkenhead re-established, comprising the county borough excluding 5 wards in the south; these were included in a new constituency, named Bebington, with the municipal borough of that name, previously part of the Wirral constituency. Wirral also lost the parts now in the expanded county boroughs of Birkenhead and Wallasey to the respective constituencies;
 a new constituency named Runcorn was created, comprising the urban districts of Runcorn (previously part of Northwich) and Lymm (previously part of Bucklow) and the rural district of Runcorn (previously split between Eddisbury, Northwich and Knutsford);
 a new constituency named Cheadle was created, comprising the urban districts of Cheadle and Gatley (previously part of Bucklow), Hazel Grove and Bramhall (previously part of Knutsford), Bredbury and Romiley, and Marple (previously part of Macclesfield);
 Eddisbury was abolished and was distributed between Crewe (the parts in the rural district of Nantwich), Northwich (the rural district of Tarvin, including Malpas and Tarporley, and the parts in the rural district of Northwich) and Runcorn (the parts in the rural district thereof, including Frodsham);
 Bucklow was abolished and distributed between Cheadle (Cheadle and Gatley), Runcorn (Lymm) and Knutsford (Hale, Bowdon and surrounding rural areas), with the parts now incorporated into Manchester forming the new constituency of Manchester, Wythenshawe;
 the 2-seat Borough of Stockport was abolished and replaced by the single-member seats of Stockport North and Stockport South;
 Alsager and Sandbach were added to Knutsford, transferred from Crewe and Northwich respectively; and
 Bollington and the parts of the rural district of Macclesfield, including Poynton, transferred from Knutsford to Macclesfield.

1955 
The First Periodic Review of Westminster constituencies resulted in the creation of Nantwich, formed from parts of the constituencies of Crewe (the urban district of Nantwich and most of the rural district of Nantwich) and Northwich (the urban districts of Middlewich and Winsford and parts of the rural districts of Northwich and Tarvin).

The only other change was the transfer of the urban districts of Alsager and Sandbach from Knutsford to Crewe.

1974 (Feb) 
The Second Periodic Review, which came into effect for the February 1974 election, resulted in the creation of Hazel Grove. This constituency was carved out of the Cheadle constituency, leaving the urban district of Cheadle and Gatley, to which the urban district of Wilmslow was added, transferred from Knutsford. Alderley Edge was transferred from Knutsford to Macclesfield.

In the Wirral, Bebington was abolished, being replaced by Bebington and Ellesmere Port, with the latter transferred from the Wirral constituency. The parts of the county borough of Birkenhead previously in Bebington were transferred back to the Birkenhead constituency, with the exception of Prenton ward, which was transferred to Wirral. Upton ward was also transferred to Wirral, from Birkenhead.

Current ceremonial county

1974 (Apr) 
Shortly after the Second Periodic Review came into effect, the county was subject to a major reconfiguration under the terms of the Local Government Act 1972. As a result, with effect from 1 April 1974, the constituencies of Altrincham and Sale, Hazel Grove, Stalybridge and Hyde1, Stockport North and Stockport South, most of Cheadle and northern parts of Knutsford were now part of the metropolitan county of Greater Manchester; and the constituencies of Birkenhead and Wallasey and the majority of Bebington and Ellesmere Port, and Wirral were now part of the new metropolitan county of Merseyside.

1Except the small part comprising the former rural district of Tintwistle, which was transferred to Derbyshire.

1983 
The next change to parliamentary constituency boundaries, following the recommendations of the Third Periodic Review, reflected the change in county boundaries and reorganisation of local government authorities in 1974. This review did not come into effect for a further nine years, at the 1983 general election, and resulted in wholescale changes, with only the constituencies of City of Chester and Macclesfield being retained in the reconfigured county. Bebington and Ellesmere Port, Crewe, Knutsford, Nantwich, Newton, Northwich, Runcorn, Warrington, Widnes and Wirral were abolished and the following new constituencies were created:
 Congleton, based on the Borough of Congleton, comprising: the former municipal borough of Congleton, previously part of the constituency of Macclesfield; Alsager, Sandbach and Haslington, previously part of Crewe; Middlewich, previously part of Nantwich; and rural areas comprising the former rural district of Congleton, previously part of Knutsford;
 Crewe and Nantwich, comprising the former municipal borough of Crewe, previously part of the Crewe constituency, and Nantwich and remaining parts of the new Borough of Crewe and Nantwich (excluding Haslington), previously part of the Nantwich constituency;
 Eddisbury (re-established), comprising parts of the former constituencies of Nantwich (including Malpas and Winsford), Northwich (including Cuddington and Weaverham) and Runcorn (including Frodsham and Helsby);
 Ellesmere Port and Neston, based on the Borough of Ellesmere Port and Neston, comprising the former municipal borough of Ellesmere Port, previously part of the Bebington and Ellesmere Port constituency, and the former urban district of Neston, previously part of Wirral. Also included Elton and rural areas to the north of Chester from the City of Chester constituency;
 Halton, based on the Borough of Halton, combining the former urban district of Runcorn (excluding Norton) and the former municipal borough of Widnes, previously parts of the former constituencies of the same names;
 Tatton, comprising the towns of Northwich and Knutsford, formerly parts of the abolished constituencies of the same names. Also included the former urban district of Wilmslow, previously part the constituency of Cheadle;
 Warrington North, comprising the majority of the former constituency of Warrington, together with parts of the abolished Newton constituency, including Poulton, Winwick and Woolston; and
 Warrington South, comprising: Norton (in Runcorn Borough) and areas to the south of the Manchester Ship Canal (including Lymm) now part of the Borough of Warrington, previously part of Runcorn constituency; a small part of Warrington; and parts of Newton, including Great Sankey and Penketh.

1997 
The Fourth Review saw another increase in the number of constituencies, with the creation Weaver Vale, which was made up as follows:
 parts of Runcorn, transferred from Halton;
 Norton, transferred from Warrington South;
 Frodsham, Helsby and Weaverham, transferred from Eddisbury; and
 Northwich, transferred from Tatton.

Other changes included:

 rural areas to the north of Chester (excluding Elton) transferred back from Ellesmere Port and Neston to City of Chester;
 Haslington transferred from Congleton to Crewe and Nantwich;
 western parts of Crewe and Nantwich, including Audlem. transferred to Eddisbury;
 Alderley Edge transferred from Macclesfield to Tatton; and
 boundary between the two Warrington seats realigned, with the town centre being transferred from Warrington South to Warrington North.

2010 
At the Fifth Periodic Review there were no changes to Cheshire's representation, with only minor changes to boundaries due primarily to the revision of local authority ward boundaries. The Halton Borough ward of Castlefield was transferred from Weaver Vale to Halton.

Maps

Historic county

Current county

Communities timeline 
The table below shows which constituencies represented major communities within the current county from 1885 onwards.

1 Birchwood, Burtonwood, Poulton-with-Fearnhead, Winwick, Woolston

2 Appleton, Grappenhall, Stockton Heath

3 Great Sankey, Penketh

See also 

 List of parliamentary constituencies in Cheshire

References 

Parliamentary constituencies in Cheshire